Yevgeny Alexeyevich Kiselyov (born 15 June 1956) is a Russian television journalist. As the host of the NTV weekly news show Itogi in the 1990s, he became one of the nation's best known television journalists, criticizing government corruption and President Boris Yeltsin. In 2001, he left NTV following its takeover by the state-controlled company Gazprom, serving briefly as general manager of TV-6 before the government refused to renew its broadcasting license in January 2002. He later moved to Ukraine, where he became a presenter of various political talk shows.

Background 
Kiselyov is the son of an aviation engineer. A student in Persian at Moscow State University, he later worked as an interpreter in Iran and Afghanistan during the Soviet–Afghan War. He began his broadcast career with the Persian service of Radio Moscow in 1984, moving to television three years later. He became famous in 1991 when he refused to report official Soviet news as the USSR was losing control of the Baltic states.

Itogi host 
Kiselyov was a "pioneering" television journalist in Russia in the 1990s after the dissolution of the Soviet Union, and in 1997, the New York Times described him as "Russia's most prominent television journalist".

During this period, he hosted the popular weekly news show Itogi ("Results") on the independent station NTV. The show was modeled on the long-running US news program 60 Minutes. Kiselyov described Itogi'''s politics as "anti-Communist, pro-reform and pro-democracy", and it specialized in investigating government corruption. However, critics stated that the show was "excessively politicized", and settled scores on behalf of the station's owner.

In 1999, Itogi broadcast an episode in which Kiselyov broke new ground by lambasting the administration of Boris Yeltsin, describing them as "the family", an "insiders' code phrase" for Yeltsin and his small circle of advisers. He criticized them for handpicking the latest Cabinet, comparing Yeltsin's rule to that of the Roman emperor Caligula.

 Closure of independent stations 
As NTV's managing director, Kiselyov was active in protests when a Russian court gave control of the station to the state-controlled company Gazprom, describing the takeover as an attempt by the government of Vladimir Putin to suppress dissent. In April 2001, he and several others were ousted from the board of directors by Gazprom. NTV's journalists condemned the cull, stating that the "ultimate goal of this meeting is the imposing of full political control over us". Along with a number of NTV journalists, he moved to rival station TV-6.

With the arrival of the NTV team, TV-6's ratings more than doubled. Kiselyov continued to report on sensitive topics including corruption and the conflict in Chechnya. He also became the station's general manager. In January 2002, however, the station's broadcasting license expired and was given by the government to another company, forcing them off the air. Kiselyov called it a "television coup" showing that the authorities' "single goal" was to "gag" the station. The government disputed his statement, saying that the non-renewal of TV-6's license was "purely a business decision".

In March 2002, Kiselyov teamed with the Media-Socium Group, a group of pro-Putin businesspeople that included former prime minister Yevgeny Primakov, and was re-awarded the broadcasting license to the station. A BBC News analyst stated that the new political ownership was "likely to ensure the journalists do not ruffle too many feathers above". The new station, TVS, soon ran into financial difficulties and quarrels between shareholders, and was closed by the government in June 2003 on the grounds of "viewers' interests". Though viewed as less critical than its predecessor, it had been the last television station to criticize the Putin government. With the station's end, Nezavisimaya Gazeta called Russia "the one-channel country", stating that private television had once again disappeared, and Ekho Moskvy criticized the "complete state monopoly of country-wide channels". Kiselyov stated that his priority following the closure was to find new jobs for the news staff, some of whom had now followed him through three television stations.

 Move to Ukraine 
In 2008, Kiselyov moved to Ukraine. He stated that he moved because working in Ukraine allowed him to be a true political journalist. "In Russia, there is no open political debate any more. The authorities are hermetically sealed, we can just hypothesize about the discussion going on inside ... Here [in Ukraine] you have access to tons of information, to almost any politician". He also said that he felt Russian journalism had developed a culture of self-censorship.

Since September 2009, Kiselyov hosted a sociopolitical talk show called Big-Time Politics with Yevgeny Kiselyov on Inter. Kiselyov presented his (Ukrainian) shows in Russian; his guests spoke Ukrainian or Russian.

On 21 May 2010, deputy head of the Administration of Ukraine Hanna Herman stated the wish that Ukraine's most popular political talk shows be anchored only by Ukrainian journalists: "We are still victims to that imperial complex that 'everything coming from Moscow is good, everything Ukrainian is bad'".

The viewership of Big-Time Politics'' dropped from 1 million in 2007 to 500,000 people in 2011, reflecting a general decline in interest in political talk shows. In January 2013 Inter replaced it by a political talk show hosted by Anna Bezulyk. Kiselyov from then on is in charge of the news production at Inter. In the summer of 2016 Kiselyov left Inter. He then moved to Pryamiy kanal to present the program "Results". Kiselyov left Pryamiy kanal in the summer of 2019 and became the presenter of "Real Politics with Yevgeny Kiselyov" early 2020 on the channel Ukraine 24.

Awards 
In 1995, Kiselyov won the International Press Freedom Award of the US-based Committee to Protect Journalists, which recognizes journalists who show courage in defending press freedom despite facing attacks, threats, or imprisonment.

References 

Living people
1956 births
Echo of Moscow radio presenters
Moscow State University alumni
Russian emigrants to Ukraine
Russian television presenters
Ukrainian journalists
Ukrainian television personalities
Mass media people from Moscow
Recipients of the Order of the Cross of Terra Mariana, 4th Class
Russian activists against the 2022 Russian invasion of Ukraine
People listed in Russia as foreign agents